David Bradley Armstrong (May 24, 1954 – October 26, 2014) was an American photographer based in New York.

Armstrong first exhibited his work in 1977 and had one-person shows in New York City, Boston, Berlin, Paris, Rome, Zurich, Düsseldorf, Lisbon, Munich, and Amsterdam. His work was included in numerous group museum exhibitions including Visions from America: Photographs from The Whitney Museum of American Art, 1940-2001 in 2003, Emotions and Relations at the Hamburger Kunsthalle in 1998, and the 1995 Whitney Biennial.

Personal life
Armstrong was born in 1954, in Arlington, Massachusetts, one of four sons of Robert and Irma Armstrong. He graduated from the Satya Community School, an alternative high school in Lincoln, Massachusetts, where he met Nan Goldin at the age of 14. Even though David was considered not obviously gay, he had been open to his sexual orientation long before legal action for the LGBT community had been in place. On October 26, 2014, at the age of 60, he died in Los Angeles, California due to liver cancer.

Career
Armstrong entered into the School of the Museum of Fine Arts in Boston as a painting major, but soon switched to photography after studying alongside Goldin, with whom he shared an apartment. He attended the School of the Museum of Fine Arts and Cooper Union from 1974 to 1978, and he earned a B.F.A from Tufts University in 1988 and Judy Ann Goldman Fine Art in Boston.

During the late 1970s, Armstrong became associated with the "Boston School" of photography, which included artists such as Nan Goldin, Mark Morrisroe and Jack Pierson. Their aesthetic was based on intimate snapshot portraits in saturated color.

Armstrong first received critical attention for his intimate portraits of men, either lovers or friends, in sharp focus. In the nineties, he began to photograph cityscapes and landscapes in soft focus to contrast with the resolution of his portraits. Street lights, electric signs and cars are reduced to a sensual mottled blur, complementing the vividness and tactility of his portraits.

In 1981, Armstrong created a series of black-and-white portraits which he showed at PS1's New York/New Wave exhibition. In 1996, Elisabeth Sussman, curator of photographs at the Whitney Museum, enlisted Armstrong's help in composing Goldin's first retrospective. She gained such respect for Armstrong’s eye, she acquired a few of his pieces for the Whitney permanent collection and he was subsequently featured in the Whitney 1994 biennial.

Armstrong’s work has also appeared in publications such as Vogue Paris, L'Uomo Vogue, Arena Homme +, GQ, Self Service, Another Man and Japanese Vogue and he has worked on the advertising campaigns of companies such as Zegna, René Lezard, Kenneth Cole, Burberry, Puma, and Barbara Bui. He once shot editorials for Wonderland, Vogue Hommes and Purple.

Although his primary subjects include portraits of young boys and men, Armstrong also released a book of land and cityscapes in 2002, entitled All Day, Every Day.

Exhibitions

 A Double Life, Matthew Marks Gallery, New York City, 1993
 Landscapes, Matthew Marks Gallery, New York City, 1995
 The Silver Cord, Matthew Marks Gallery, New York City, 1997
 Emotions and Relations, Hamburger Kunsthalle Hamburg, Germany, 1998
 Gallerie Barbara Farber/Rob Jurka Amsterdam, The Netherlands, 1998
 Ugo Ferranti Rome, Italy, 1998
 New Photographs, Matthew Marks Gallery, New York City, 1999
 Scalo New York, New York City, 1999
 Galerie Fricke, Berlin, 1999
 Judy Goldman Fine Art, Boston, 1999
 Bang Street Gallery, Provincetown, Massachusetts, 1999
 Joao Graça, Lisbon, 2000
 Open Studio, Toronto, 2000
 Photography in Boston: 1955 – 1985, DeCordova Museum and Sculpture Park, Lincoln, Massachusetts, 2000 (catalogue )
 New Editions, Marlborough Graphics, New York City, 2000
 Faces, Bang Street Gallery, Provincetown, Massachusetts, 2000
 Cityscapes and Landscapes, Galerie M+R Fricke, Düsseldorf, 2001
 Bang Street Gallery, Provincetown, Massachusetts, 2001
 CITY: Prints and Photographs from the 30s through Today, Brooke Alexander, New York City, 2001
 Places and People, L.A. Galerie Lothar Albrecht, Frankfurt, 2001
 Building Dwelling Thinking, Judy Ann Goldman Fine Art, Boston, 2001
 Tenth Anniversary Exhibition, 100 Drawings and Photographs, Matthew Marks Gallery, New York City, 2001 (catalogue )
 City Light, Matthew Marks Gallery, New York City, 2002
 David Armstrong: All Day Every Day, Scalo Galerie, Zurich, Switzerland, 2002
 Visions from America. Photographs from the Whitney Museum of American Art, 1940-2001, Whitney Museum of American Art, New York City, 2002 (catalogue )
 Recent Acquisitions, Dallas Museum of Art, Texas, 2002
 David Armstrong: portraits and other works, early and recent, Galerie M + R Fricke, Düsseldorf, 2003
 Flesh Tones: 100 Years of the Nude, Robert Mann Gallery, New York City, 2003
 Your Picture on My Wall, Matthew Marks Gallery, New York City, 2004
 Likeness: Portraits of Artists by Other Artists, CCA Wattis Institute for Contemporary Arts, San Francisco, 2004
 Indigestible Correctness II, Kenny Schachter Gallery, New York City, 2004
 Model Boy, Judy Ann Goldman Fine Art, Boston, 2006
 Some Tribes, Christophe Guye Galerie, Zurich, Switzerland, 2006
 True Romance - Allegorien der Liebe von der Renaissance bis heute, Kunsthalle Wien (Halle 1, Halle 2 im MQ), Vienna, 2007

Publications

Publications by Armstrong
Polariods. 2013. .
David Armstrong: All Day Every Day. 2002. .
The Silver Cord. 1997. .

Publications with others
Night and Day. By Armstrong, Rene Richard and Jack Pierson. 2012 .
David Armstrong: 615 Jefferson Avenue. By Armstrong, Nick Vogelson, Anton Aparin and Boyd Holbrook. 2011. .
A Double Life. By Armstrong and Nan Goldin. 1994 .
Faces of Hope:AIDS and Addiction in America.By Armstrong and Rory Kennedy. 2001.

References

1954 births
2014 deaths
American photographers
People from Arlington, Massachusetts
School of the Museum of Fine Arts at Tufts alumni
Artists from New York City
Deaths from liver cancer
American LGBT photographers